Amanita protecta is a species of Amanita found in California growing solitary among Quercus agrifolia and Monterey pine.

References

External links

protecta
Fungi of California
Fungi described in 1989